
Gmina Osina is a rural gmina (administrative district) in Goleniów County, West Pomeranian Voivodeship, in north-western Poland.

Villages
Gmina Osina contains the villages and settlements of Bodzęcin, Gorzęcino, Kałużna, Kikorze, Kościuszki, Krzywice, Osina, Przypólsko, Redło, Redostowo, Węgorza and Węgorzyce.

Neighbouring gminas
Gmina Osina is bordered by the gminas of Goleniów, Maszewo, Nowogard and Przybiernów.

References
Polish official population figures 2006

Osina
Goleniów County